The Men's 800 metre freestyle competition of the 2016 European Aquatics Championships was held on 19 and 20 May 2016.

Records
Prior to the competition, the existing world, European and championship records were as follows.

Results

Heats
The heats were held on 19 May at 10:53.

Final
The final was held on 20 May at 18:02.

References

Men's 800 metre freestyle